Holland Coffee (born 15 August 1807) was an American trader, guide, interpreter, and representative of Fannin County. He was involved with the settlement of present-day Lake Texoma area and acted as a liaison between the native west and Caucasian settlers. Coffee was known chiefly for his trading and relations with Native American tribes such as the Comanches, Kiowa, Caddo, Wichita, and Delaware, and his many trading posts established in places such as Tillman, Love, and Cotton Counties. While Coffee was known for his prosperity, his land expansions brought along debt as well.

Biography

Early life 
Coffee was born in Warren County, Tennessee to Mildred (Moore) and Ambrose Coffee. Coffee became an orphan at the age of 11 and was sent to live with his uncle Jesse Coffee in McMinnville, Tennessee.

Coffee, Colville, and Company Days 
In 1829, Holland Coffee and Silas Colville arrived in Fort Smith, Arkansas, where they established Coffee, Colville, and Company. Later in the 1830s Coffee and Colville established a trading post on the Red River where they traded horses with Native American tribes such as the Comanches. Mexican officials blamed this horse trading for raids on Mexican ranches, even going so far as to say that Coffee encouraged them Many at the time came to dislike Coffee enough to want government intervention on his trading posts, which led to a failed assassination attempt. During that time the Texas congress twice reimbursed Coffee for negotiating ransoms with Native Americans to free Caucasian settlers. In 1835, Coffee was noted as a major contributor to the Camp Holmes Treaty. In 1838, Coffee married Sophia Suttenfield Aughinbaugh four days after her divorce from her marriage with Jesse Aughinbaugh.

Representative Days 
Coffee was elected as the first Representative of the newly-established Fannin County in the 1838-1839 Texas House of Representatives session. He was selected to help enact a treaty between Texas and Native Americans at Shawnee Village. He was known for his positive relations with many Native Americans and could speak seven different native dialects. Coffee's prosperity was attributed to the trading he conducted with the Natives; he traded weapons and alcohol in exchange for cattle that was claimed to be stolen by the Native Americans. Coffee profited from negotiations and diplomatic relations with a relatively untapped Indian market. While these deals could be very dangerous, Coffee and his land never were seriously harmed the Natives.

Glen Eden Days 
In 1840, Coffee and Colville decided to conclude their partnership and divided their joint land equally. While it is unknown why the partnership ended, some scholars believe the split resulted from Coffee's marriage to Sophie Suttenfield Aughinbaugh the year before. After the Arkansas government opposed a proposed alcohol trading policy, Coffee left Fort Smith and built a trading post on the Red River. A few years later, Coffee moved his trading post farther downstream. At the time, Coffee handled many military supply needs which were paid for in land. Shortly after this point Coffee moved away from general trading and began farming. In 1843, he built a home he named Glen Eden where he lived about three years.

In 1845 Coffee's Bend, thanks to close access to the military road established by William G. Cooke from 1840 to 1841, became the most populous section of Preston County (present-day Grayson County). . At this trading post Coffee supplied the Native Americans in accordance with treaties in effect at the time. Coffee also supplied, and many times acted as a guide, for various groups, notably Jacob M. Snavely's Expedition against a Mexican trade caravan.

Death 
Coffee died on October 1, 1846 from being stabbed in a fight with Chas A. Galloway. The cause of the fight is unknown. Some scholars conjecture that the conflict began when Coffee responded to an offensive comment about his wife. Coffee was buried behind his home, Glen Eden; his remains later were relocated to Preston Bend Cemetery.

References

1807 births
1846 deaths
People from Warren County, Tennessee
People from Fannin County, Texas
County officials in Texas
Deaths by stabbing in the United States